The following Confederate Army units and commanders fought in the Battle of Westport of the American Civil War. The Union order of battle is listed separately.

Abbreviations used

Military rank
 MG = Major General
 BG = Brigadier General
 Col = Colonel
 Ltc = Lieutenant Colonel
 Maj = Major
 Cpt = Captain
 Lt = 1st Lieutenant

Other
 w = wounded

Army of Missouri

MG Sterling Price

Notes

References

Sources
 

 

 

American Civil War orders of battle
Missouri in the American Civil War